Mary Callaghan is an Irish Social Democrats politician who has represented Ballymun-Finglas on Dublin City Council since 2019. She served as Deputy Lord Mayor of Dublin to then Lord Mayor Hazel Chu from 2020 to 2021. She was elected Deputy Mayor with a 43 to 9 margin, marking the third time in history that the top two positions in Dublin have both been held by women.

References

External links
Social Democrats profile

Living people
Alumni of University College Dublin
Local councillors in Dublin (city)
People from Finglas
Social Democrats (Ireland) politicians
Year of birth missing (living people)